Joachim Begrich (13 June 1900 – 26 April 1945) was a German biblical scholar and theologian born in Predel, a hamlet now belonging to Elsteraue in the state of Saxony-Anhalt. He was the son of a pastor and the son-in-law of Old Testament scholar Hermann Gunkel (1862–1932).

He studied philology, Assyriology and theology at the University of Leipzig, then transferred to Halle, where he focused his studies on theology. In 1923/24 he attended the seminary in Stettin, earning his doctorate at Halle in 1926. In 1930 he was appointed associate professor of Old Testament studies at the University of Leipzig. During World War II he served as a paramedic, and lost his life in Dussoi, near Belluno, Italy less than two weeks prior to the end of hostilities in Europe.

Begrich was the author of a scholarly work on the chronology of the kings of Israel and Judah called Die Chronologie der Könige von Israel und Juda (1929), and a book on "Deutero-Isaiah" titled Studien zu Deuterojesaja (1938). He also assisted Hermann Gunkel with the latter's Einleitung in die Psalmen, later translated into English and published with the title Introduction to Psalms : the genres of the religious lyric of Israel. Two of his most memorable essays are on the priestly oracle of salvation/deliverance and the priestly Torah; these appear in his Gesammelte Studien.

Bibliography

References 

1900 births
1945 deaths
People from Burgenlandkreis
People from the Province of Saxony
20th-century German Protestant theologians
German male non-fiction writers
Academic staff of Leipzig University
German military personnel killed in World War II